The Impact Hall of Fame (stylized as IMPACT! Hall of Fame) is a hall of fame that honors professional wrestlers and wrestling personalities who contributed to the history of the U.S. based wrestling promotion Impact Wrestling formally known as Total Nonstop Action Wrestling (TNA).

It was established in 2012 and created as part of the celebration of the promotion's 10th anniversary. Inductees are usually announced at either Slammiversary or episodes of Impact!, and the ceremony takes place prior to Bound for Glory. Since its inception there have been two years where no inductions have taken place.

As of 2022, there have been 11 inducted in total; nine individually, and one group induction.

Ceremony dates and locations

Inductees

Individuals

Group inductions

References

External links
 The TNA/Impact Hall of Fame

2012 establishments in the United States
Awards established in 2012
Hall of Fameta
Professional wrestling-related lists
Professional wrestling halls of fame

da:Total Nonstop Action#TNA Hall of Fame
pt:Total Nonstop Action Wrestling#Hall da Fama da TNA